Euproctis marginalis, the margined browntail moth, is a moth of the family Erebidae. The species was first described by Francis Walker in 1855. It is found in Australia, including Tasmania.

References

Lymantriinae
Moths described in 1855